Subbotin is a rural locality (a khutor) in Mikhaylovka Urban Okrug, Volgograd Oblast, Russia. The population was 263 as of 2010. There are 2 streets.

Geography 
Subbotin is located 61 km northeast of Mikhaylovka. Razdory is the nearest rural locality.

References 

Rural localities in Mikhaylovka urban okrug